The 2018–19 Spartak Moscow season was the twenty-seventh successive season that the club played in the Russian Premier League, the highest tier of association football in Russia.

Season events
On 22 October 2018, Massimo Carrera was sacked as manager, with Raúl Riancho being appointed as caretaker manager.

Squad

Transfers

In

Loans in

Out

Loans out

Released

Competitions

Russian Premier League

Results by round

Results

League table

Russian Cup

UEFA Champions League

Qualifying rounds

UEFA Europe League

Group stage

Squad statistics

Appearances and goals

|-
|colspan="14"|Players away from the club on loan:

|-
|colspan="14"|Players who left Spartak Moscow during the season:

|}

Goal scorers

Clean sheets

Disciplinary record

References

External links

FC Spartak Moscow seasons
Spartak Moscow
Spartak Moscow
Spartak Moscow